Ramat Gan ( or) is a city in the Tel Aviv District of Israel, located east of the municipality of Tel Aviv and part of the Tel Aviv metropolitan area. It is home to a Diamond Exchange District (one of the world's major diamond exchanges), Sheba Medical Center (the largest hospital in Israel) and many high-tech industries.

Ramat Gan was established in 1921 as a moshav shitufi, a communal farming settlement.

History

Ramat Gan was established by the Ir Ganim association in 1921 as a satellite town of Tel Aviv. The first plots of land were purchased between 1914 and 1918. It stood just south of the Arab village of Jarisha. The settlement was initially a moshava, a Zionist agricultural colony that grew wheat, barley and watermelons. The name of the settlement was changed to Ramat Gan (lit: Garden Height) in 1923. The settlement continued to operate as a moshava until 1933, although it achieved local council status in 1926. At this time it had 450 residents. In the 1940s, Ramat Gan became a battleground in the country's language war: A Yiddish language printing press in Ramat Gan was blown up by Hebrew-language extremists.

Over the years, the economy shifted from agriculture to commerce and industry. By 1946, the population had grown to 12,000. In 1950, Ramat Gan was recognized as a city. The city's population was greatly boosted by an influx of Iraqi Jews into Israel during Operation Ezra and Nehemiah. So many Iraqi immigrants settled in Ramat Gan that it became known as "Little Baghdad." In 1955, it had a population of 55,000. The first mayor was Avraham Krinitzi who remained in office for 43 years. In 1961, the municipal area of Ramat Gan expanded eastward, to encompass the area that includes the Sheba Medical Center in Tel Hashomer and Bar Ilan University. In 1968, the world's largest diamond exchange opened in Ramat Gan. The Sheba Medical Center and the Israel Diamond Exchange are located in Ramat Gan.

Geography and climate
Ramat Gan is located in the Gush Dan metropolitan area east of Tel Aviv. It is bounded in the north by the Yarkon River and in the east by Bnei Brak. Giv'atayim lies to the southwest.

It is built on limestone hills. Ramat Gan parks include The National Park (Park Leumi) which covers some 1,900 dunams, and David Park in the Merom Naveh neighborhood. 25% of Ramat Gan is covered by public parkland.

Ramat Gan neighborhoods include: Shchunat Hageffen, City Center, Nachalat Ganim, Kiryat Krinitzi, Ramat Shikma, Ramat Yitzhak, Shchunat Rishonim, Tel Yehuda, Givat Geula, Neve Yehoshua, Kiryat Borochov, Merom Naveh, Ramat Amidar, Ramat Chen, Shikun Vatikim, Shchunat Hillel, Elite and Diamond Exchange District and Tel Binyamin.

Demographics

According to the 1931 census, Ramat Gan had 975 inhabitants, in 253 houses. 
, Ramat Gan had 129,700 residents, on an area of 12,000 dunams (12 km2). The population was growing at a rate of 1.0% per annum with 90% of this growth coming through natural increase. The population density of the city is 9,822.6 per square kilometer, one of the highest in Israel. In terms of the origin of Ramat Gan's residents, 42,900 originate from Europe and America, 10,200 from Africa, 29,200 from Asia, and 40,600 from Israel. 86,200 of the residents of Ramat Gan were born in Israel, whilst 36,600 were born abroad.

According to the Israel Central Bureau of Statistics, as of 2001, Ramat Gan's socioeconomic ranking stood at 8 out of 10. 70.9% of twelfth grade students received a matriculation certificate in 2000. That year, the average wages in Ramat Gan were 6,995 NIS. , 32,100 of the city's households had people who were not in the labour force, with 23,300 of these retired. 1,900 of the households had unemployed within them. 43,000 households were fully employed. The largest sectors of jobs for those in employment in Ramat Gan were business activities accounting for 18.1% of jobs, education, 15.1%, wholesale and retail trade, and repairs, 14.2%, manufacturing 10.8%, and health, welfare and social work services, 10.0%.

Economy

Also located in the Diamond Exchange District is the State Bank of India's Israeli headquarters and the headquarters of Bank Mizrachi, whilst the embassies of Ghana, Kenya, Ivory Coast, Jordan, Eritrea, Norway, Belgium, the Netherlands, and the European Economic Community, are located in the area. A number of other international embassies are also located in the city, as is the British Council. Also headquartered in the city is the Histadrut trade union. Located to the south of Ramat Gan is Hiriya, the largest waste transfer site in the Middle East.

Ramat Gan is also an important center for industry and manufacturing with major fruit and vegetable canning plants, textile mills, metal production plants, electrical manufacturers, furniture makers, and food producers based here. Currently, the Elite Tower, set to exceed the Moshe Aviv Tower in height, is being built on the site of the historic Elite Candy factory. As a tribute to the history of the site, the lower floors of the tower will house a chocolate museum. At the end of 2006, Ramat Gan had three hotels, with a total of 408 rooms with 150,000 person-nights over the year representing 64% room occupancy.

Local government
The mayor of Ramat Gan is Carmel Shama.

Below is a complete list of mayors:

Education

Ramat Gan is home to Israel's second largest university, Bar-Ilan University, with 24,000 students. The city is also the location of the Shenkar College of Engineering and Design, Ramat Gan College, the College of Law and Business, Beit Zvi acting college.

Religions

Judaism
Ramat Gan has 112 synagogues, two yeshivot, and a Kabbalah Center.

Other
Ramat Gan also has a Buddhist temple, and a Scientology center.

Healthcare
The Sheba Medical Center located in southeastern Ramat Gan and Tel HaShomer, is Israel's largest hospital. It includes the Safra Children's Hospital and Padeh Geriatric Rehabilitation Center. The city has 32 medical centers run by health authorities and 10 child-care clinics operated by the municipality. The city is also served by Mayanei Hayeshua Medical Center, a Haredi hospital in nearby Bnei Brak.

Archaeology
Northwest of the city is the archaeological site of Tel Gerisa, with its main occupation phases dating back to the  Middle and Late Bronze Ages and declining through Iron Age I and II.

Culture

Cultural venues in Ramat Gan include the Ramat Gan Theater, the Diamond Theater and the Russell Cultural Center. The Beit Zvi School of Performing Arts is based in Ramat Gan. Ramat Gan operates two cinemas complexes: the Lev-Elram Cinema and the "Yes Planet" megaplex. Ramat Gan also has a safari park. The 250-acre site consists of both a drive-through African safari area and a modern outdoor zoo.

Museums
Beit Avraham Krinitzi, home of the first mayor, is now a museum of the history of Ramat Gan. Man and the Living World Museum is a natural history museum and the Maccabi Museum focuses on the history of Jewish sports since 1898. The Ramat Gan Safari, a  zoo housing 1,600 animals, is the largest animal collection in the Middle East. Other museums in the city include the Museum of Israeli Art, Kiryat Omanut which houses sculpture galleries and a ceramics studio, the Museum of Russian Art, the Museum of Jewish Art, and the Yehiel Nahari Museum of Far Eastern Art.

Sports

The Maccabiah Games are held in Ramat Gan every four years. Ramat Gan Stadium is Israel's national football stadium until 2014. Seating 41,583 (13,370 is a permitted seats). Hakoah Amidar Ramat Gan and Hapoel Ramat Gan who both play at the Winter Stadium, are the city's main football clubs, both having won the championship at some point in their history. Beitar Ramat Gan plays in the South A Division of Liga Bet, the fourth tier, whilst F.C. Mahanaim Ramat Gan, Maccabi Hashikma Hen, Maccabi Spartak Ramat Gan and Shikun Vatikim Ramat Gan are all playing in the Tel Aviv Division of Liga Gimel, the fifth tier. The now-defunct clubs Maccabi Ramat Gan and Maccabi Ramat Amidar were both involved in mergers which formed Hakoah Amidar. In basketball, Ironi Ramat Gan plays in Ligat HaAl, the top division.

Notable people

 Avi Arad (born 1948), CEO and founder of Marvel Studios
 Lior Ashkenazi (born 1968), actor
 Gilad Atzmon (born 1963), jazz saxophonist
 Ehud Banai (born 1953), singer and songwriter
 Yoram Ben-Porat (1937–1992), economist and president of the Hebrew University of Jerusalem
 Moshe Bromberg (1920–1982), a.k.a. Moshe Bar-Am; painter, artist
 Danny Danon (born 1971), politician
 Lior Eliyahu (born 1985), basketball player
 Tal Erel (born 1996), Israel National Baseball Team player
 Ofer Fleisher (born 1966), basketball player
 David Frankfurter (1909–1982), executioner in 1936 of Swiss Nazi Party leader Wilhelm Gustloff
 Aviv Geffen (born 1973), musician
 Uzi Hitman (1952–2004), songwriter and singer
 Noam Jacobson (born 1975), musician
 Etgar Keret (born 1967), author
 James Kugel (born 1945), biblical scholar
 Amichai Lao-Lavi (born 1969), social entrepreneur, human rights activist and LGBT, conservative rabbi
 Inbar Lavi (born 1986), actress
 Lior Lubin (born 1979), basketball player and coach
 Käthe Ephraim Marcus (1892–1970), German-Israeli painter and sculptor
 Kobi Marimi (born 1991), actor and singer, Israeli representative at Eurovision Song Contest 2019
 Doron Menashe, law professor
 Oren Peli (born 1970), film producer
 Vicky Peretz (1953–2021), international footballer
 Daniel Poleshchuk (b. 1996), squash player
 Ilan Ramon (1954–2003), first Israeli astronaut; killed in Space Shuttle Columbia disaster
 Dahlia Ravikovitch (1936–2005), poet
 Ze'ev Revach (born 1940), actor
 Gilad Segev (born 1974), singer and songwriter
 Ron Shachar (born 1962), professor and researcher
 Rona-Lee Shimon (born 1982), actress
 Silvan Shalom (born 1958), politician
 Yuval Spungin (born 1987), football player
 Tal Stricker (born 1979), Olympic swimmer
 Michael Zandberg (born 1980), footballer
 Tamar Zandberg (born 1976), politician

Twin towns – sister cities

Ramat Gan is twinned with:

 Barnet, United Kingdom (since 1976)
 Kassel, Germany (since 1990)
 Main-Kinzig District, Germany (since 2000)
 Penza, Russia (since 2007)
 Phoenix, United States (since 2005)
 Qingdao, China (since 2012)
 Rio de Janeiro, Brazil (since 2011)
 San Borja, Peru (since 2014)
 Shenyang, China (since 1993)
 Strasbourg, France (since 1991)
 Szombathely, Hungary (since 1995)
 Taoyuan, Taiwan (since 2016)
 Weinheim, Germany (since 1999)
 Wrocław, Poland (since 1997)

References

External links

 Ramat-Gan municipal website

 
Cities in Tel Aviv District
Cities in Israel
Populated places established in 1921
1921 establishments in Mandatory Palestine